The Portage Group, also known as the Nunda Group, Portage Formation, or Portage Shale, are all obsolete, now abandoned, names for fossiliferous, sedimentary strata of Late Devonian age in New York. It was named for extensive outcrops found along the Genesee River in an area formerly included in town of Nunda, now in Portage, New York in the southwest corner of Livingston County.

See also

 List of fossiliferous stratigraphic units in New York

References

Notes
 

Geologic groups of New York (state)